NGC 2 is a spiral galaxy in the constellation Pegasus, discovered by Lawrence Parsons, 4th Earl of Rosse on 20 August 1873, and was described as "very faint, small, south of NGC 1." It lies slightly to the south of NGC 1. It is a faint spiral galaxy of apparent magnitude 14.2.

NGC 2 is about 115,000 light years in diameter, but is 3 to 5 times more luminous than the Milky Way as it is quite compact. AGC 102559, a galaxy 60,000-light-years in diameter, is the closest galaxy to NGC 2, being only 1.8 million light-years from it. Although it is apparently quite close to NGC 1, the latter is closer and unrelated to NGC 2.

References

External links
 
 Source: NGC/IC Project
 

Galaxies discovered in 1873
NGC 0002
NGC 0002
0002
00059
00567
18730820
Discoveries by Lawrence Parsons